Aratus is a small lunar impact crater located on the highland to the south and east of the rugged Montes Apenninus range. It is a circular, cup-shaped crater with a relatively high albedo. It was named after Greek astronomer Aratus of Soli. To the east is the Mare Serenitatis, and to the southwest is the somewhat larger crater Conon. North-northeast of Aratus is the landing site of the Apollo 15 mission, just beyond Mons Hadley Delta.

Satellite craters
By convention these features are identified on lunar maps by placing the letter on the side of the crater midpoint that is closest to Aratus.

The following craters have been renamed by the IAU.
 Aratus A—See Galen (crater).

Aratus CA
This three-pronged feature is located in western Mare Serenitatis. It is formed from a merged group of depressions in the lunar surface, and may be a volcanic vent.

The three elongated depressions have been given individual names:

Two small craters in the vicinity of Aratus CA have also been assigned names:

Manuel is just beyond the eastern tip of Vallis Krishna, while Yoshi is just beyond the western tip of Vallis Christel.  Manuel is very difficult to see, even on high-resolution photos.

The five names listed above first appeared on the Defense Mapping Agency's Topophotomaps 42A4/S1 and 42A4/S2 and were approved by the IAU in 1976.  Because of a ban on the use of lettered crater names that was in effect at the time those maps were prepared, Aratus CA was given the provisional new name Lorca.  The name Lorca was never approved by the IAU, despite notations to the contrary on Defense Mapping Agency maps LM-41 and LM-42, and the former name Aratus CA (which had first appeared on LAC-42, published in 1965 ) was officially re-adopted by the IAU in 2006.

Trending to the north from Aratus CA is a wrinkle ridge in the surface that has been designated Dorsum Owen. To the east is a longer, parallel wrinkle-ridge named Dorsum von Cotta. Further to the north-northeast is Linné, surrounded by a bright skirt of high-albedo material. About the same distance to the southwest is the Montes Haemus mountain range at the edge of the lunar mare.

The selenographic colongitude of this grouping at dawn is 349°.

References

 
 LTO-42A4 Linne—topographic map of Aratus CA and the surrounding terrain.
 Topophotomap 42A4S1(10)  and Topophotomap 42A4S2(10)  showing location of minor named features. The overall structure, "Aratus CA", is labeled "Lorca" on these maps.
 LM-41  and LM-42  incorrectly listing the name "Lorca" as an IAU-approved replacement for "Aratus CA".
 
 
 
 
 
 
 
 
 
 
 

Impact craters on the Moon